The 1959–60 St. John's Redmen basketball team represented St. John's University during the 1959–60 college basketball season.

Roster

Schedule and results

|-
!colspan=9 style="background:#FF0000; color:white;"| Regular Season

|-
!colspan=9 style="background:#FF0000; color:#FFFFFF;"| NIT

References

St. John's Red Storm men's basketball seasons
St. John's
St. John's
St. John's Redmen bask
St. John's Redmen bask